Anouk Anna Hoogendijk (born 6 May 1985) is a Dutch former professional footballer who played for Ajax as a midfielder or defender. She is nicknamed Noukie. A full international with over 100 caps since 2004 for the Dutch national team, she has represented the nation at one FIFA Women's World Cup and two UEFA Women's Euro tournaments. She played for Bristol Academy Women in the inaugural 2011 FA WSL campaign.

Club career
Hoogendijk came to prominence aged 12, as a contestant on the "Geef Nooit Op" (Never Give Up) TV program. She wished to train with FC Utrecht and, after a spell with Saestum, eventually signed for Utrecht at the outset of the Eredivisie Vrouwen in 2007. Hoogendijk realised her ambition of playing abroad when she signed an eight-month contract with English WSL club Bristol Academy in January 2011.

In February 2012 Hoogendijk returned to Utrecht, before moving on to newly formed Ajax Vrouwen in May 2012. The transfer represented "a dream come true" for Hoogendijk as she had been a girlhood supporter of Ajax's male team.

In January 2014, Hoogendijk signed for the English club Arsenal Ladies. However, due to persistent injuries she only played in 3 matches during that season in London. In July 2014, Hoogendijk eventually returned for the 2014–15 season to Ajax Vrouwen. On 30 May 2016, she announced on her Instagram official account one-year extension of contract with Ajax Vrouwen.

International career
On 6 August 2004 Hoogendijk debuted for the senior Netherlands women's national football team, as a half-time substitute in a 2–0 defeat to Japan in Zeist.

Hoogendijk played in every match as the Netherlands reached the semi-final of UEFA Women's Euro 2009. In the quarter-final penalty shootout win over France, she struck the winning kick.

In June 2013 national team coach Roger Reijners selected Hoogendijk in the Netherlands squad for UEFA Women's Euro 2013 in Sweden. Playing in defence, Hoogendijk contributed to a very promising 0–0 draw with champions Germany in the team's opening game. She was disappointed when subsequent 1–0 defeats to Norway and Iceland consigned the Netherlands to a first round elimination: "I know it's not the end of the world but today it feels like the end of the world."

International summary

International goals
Scores and results list the Netherlands goal tally first.

Honours

Club

SV Saestum
 Hoofdklasse: 2005, 2006
 Dutch Super Cup: 2005, 2006

FC Utrecht
 Dutch Super Cup: 2010
 KNVB Women's Cup: 2009–10

Arsenal
 FA Women's Cup : 2014

Ajax
 Eredivisie: 2016–17

Style of play

Hoogendijk is a versatile defensive player, she can play as central midfielder and centre back. She does not have great technique on the ball, but she stands out for her physical strength, positioning, and ability to win balls back. She is strong off the ball and is a great header.

Sponsors, media and other activities

Hoogendijk is a U.S. sportswear company Nike athlete since 2009, especially in the Netherlands. She participated in the brand campaigns Here I Am, Make Yourself and Move more, move better. Hoogendijk wears the Nike CTR360 Maestri since 2009 until its discontinuance, replacing them with the new silo Nike Magista in 2014. Finally, she chose to switch to the Nike Tiempo.

The book Balverliefd written together with Vicente de Vries, was published in April 2015. The book contains Hoogendijk biography, tips and tricks for young football players. During the Women's Euro 2022 tournament, she was an analyst for the BBC.

Personal life

Hoogendijk grew up in Mijdrecht, and is daughter of physical education teachers. She has one brother. She had her first son in October 2020.

References

External links

 
 
 
 Profile at Onsoranje.nl (in Dutch)
 Profile at vrouwenvoetbalnederland.nl (in Dutch)
 

1985 births
Living people
People from Woerden
Dutch women's footballers
Netherlands women's international footballers
Bristol Academy W.F.C. players
Women's Super League players
AFC Ajax (women) players
Footballers from Utrecht (province)
Eredivisie (women) players
Arsenal W.F.C. players
2015 FIFA Women's World Cup players
Women's association football midfielders
Women's association football central defenders
FC Utrecht (women) players
Expatriate women's footballers in England
FIFA Century Club
Dutch expatriate women's footballers
Dutch expatriate sportspeople in England
SV Saestum players